Samarium(III) sulfide (Sm2S3) is a chemical compound of the rare earth element samarium, and sulfur. In this compound samarium is in the +3 oxidation state, and sulfur is an anion in the −2 state.

Production
One way to make Samarium(III) sulfide is to heat samarium metal with sulfur. Another way to make a thin film is to alternatively soak in samarium(III) chloride tartaric acid complex, and sodium thiosulfate.

Properties
The low temperature α form crystallises in the orthorhombic crystal system. The unit cell has dimensions a=7.376, b=3.9622 c=15.352 Å with volume 448.7 Å3. There are four of the formula in each unit cell (Sm8S12). The density comes out to 5.88 kg/liter. There are two kinds of samarium coordination in the solid, one is eight coordinated with sulfur surrounding in a bicapped trigonal pyramid. The other is a sevenfold  capped distorted octahedral arrangement. This structure is similar to other light rare-earth element sulfides.

Samarium(III) sulfide is a semiconductor with a band gap of 1.7 eV. As a thin film on high area electrodes, it is under investigation as a super capacitor dielectric, with specific capacitances of up to 360 Farads per gram.

Related
Related samarium sulfides include the monosulfide SmS and the mixed valent Sm3S4 which are also semiconductors. KSm2CuS6 is a layered quaternary sulfide.

References

Sulfides
Samarium compounds